Monplaisir may refer to:

Monplaisir Palace, Peterhof, Russia
Monplaisir Garden, Peterhof, Russia
Monplaisir, Lyon, a district in Lyon, France
Monplaisir (surname)
Monplaisir, a former plantation house located in the present-day McDonoghville section of Gretna, Louisiana.

See also
Château de Mon Plaisir, Sir Seewoosagur Ramgoolam Botanical Garden, Mauritius